Frédéric Oumar Kanouté (born 2 September 1977) is a former professional footballer who played as a striker for several top-tier clubs in Europe, enjoying his greatest success with La Liga side Sevilla. Kanouté was named the 2007 African Footballer of the Year, the first player born outside Africa to win the award.

Kanouté began his career with Lyon in France before moving to West Ham United of the Premier League in 2000. After a spell at their London rivals Tottenham Hotspur, Kanouté moved to Spanish club Sevilla where he won two consecutive UEFA Cups in 2006 and 2007 in addition to various other European and domestic honours and remains the club's highest-scoring foreign player. He joined Beijing Goan in June 2012.

Despite appearing 6 times for France U-21, Kanouté was a member of the Malian squad which reached the semi-finals of the 2004 African Cup of Nations and also featured in their selections for the tournament in 2006 and 2010. His international career ended in 2010 with a total of 38
caps and 23 goals.

Early life
Kanouté was born in Sainte-Foy-lès-Lyon, Rhône.

Club career

Lyon
Kanouté's talents as a striker were first noticed by his local team, Olympique Lyonnais, and he joined them as an apprentice in 1997. He made his debut in the Intertoto Cup against Polish side Odra Wodzisław.

West Ham United

In 2000, Kanouté was signed by English Premier League side West Ham United on an initial loan basis. He formed a solid partnership with Paolo Di Canio and after some promising appearances in the Premier League, Hammers manager Harry Redknapp made his move permanent. Kanouté had varying success at the Boleyn Ground, often praised for his ability, but also criticised for his laid back attitude. West Ham were relegated at the end of the 2002-03 season.

Tottenham Hotspur
Kanouté was bought by Tottenham Hotspur for a fee of £3.5 million on 5 August 2003. He scored on his debut on 23 August, the winner in a 2-1 home league victory over Leeds United, nine minutes after coming on for Bobby Zamora.

His first season was interrupted by a call-up for the 2004 African Cup of Nations for Mali. Tottenham tried to stop him going by asking FIFA whether Kanouté was eligible to play for Mali after representing France at Under-20 level.
 
Kanouté was unable to cement himself as a regular at White Hart Lane, as Robbie Keane and Jermain Defoe were preferred. He became a less prolific goalscorer and instead was involved in attacks by setting up various goals with runs at the defence and creating space for other attacking players.

Sevilla

Kanouté was sold to Sevilla on 17 August 2005 for €6.5 million. He was a second-half substitute for the club in the 2006 UEFA Cup Final against Middlesbrough and scored in the 89th minute as Sevilla won 4–0.

In the 2006-07 UEFA Cup, Kanouté's first games for Sevilla against Tottenham Hotspur led to him scoring a penalty at the Ramón Sánchez Pizjuán Stadium in a game marred by crowd trouble, and a goal at White Hart Lane, leaving the final aggregate score 4–3 to Sevilla.

Sevilla's title challenge that year ultimately unravelled and Real Madrid took the title, with Kanouté's side in third. After that, he was a consistent member of the team, helping Sevilla qualify for a UEFA Cup position in 2008 and a Champions League direct qualification in 2009.

On the first day of the 2009–10 season, Kanouté received two yellow cards for fouls against Valencia and was sent off in first half stoppage time.

On 22 October 2011, during the 2011–12 season, Kanouté received two yellow cards against FC Barcelona for kicking the ball off the penalty spot, when Lionel Messi was due to take it. The second yellow was for an altercation between Kanouté and Cesc Fàbregas. Kanouté's farewell season in Spain was plagued with injuries as he participated in 26 matches, scoring four goals and assisting two others – he left at the end of his contract in the summer of 2012. Kanoute became an iconic figure at the Ramon Sanchez Pizjuan, netting 136 goals in 290 matches as helped the club to win two UEFA Cups, one UEFA Super Cup, two Copa del Rey trophies and one Spanish Supercup.

Beijing Guoan
On 29 June 2012, Kanouté signed a one-and-a-half-year contract with Chinese Super League side Beijing Guoan. On 18 July 2012, he scored his first two goals in his team's 6–0 victory against Qingdao Jonoon in the Chinese FA Cup. In May 2013, Kanouté scored a brace in a Super League fixture against Tianjin Teda.

International career
While playing for Lyon, Kanouté joined the French under-21 team. After turning 21 in 1998, Kanouté was not called up for the French national squad in 2000, 2002, or 2004. In 2004, FIFA changed its rules to allow a footballer to play for the national team of the country in which his mother or father was born. Although eligible for either, Kanouté elected to play for Mali rather than for France. Kanouté was joint top goal scorer for Mali at the 2004 African Cup of Nations. Kanouté scored four goals in four matches helping Mali to the semi-finals, where they lost to Morocco.

In October 2007, Kanouté, along with Mali international teammate Mamady Sidibé, were attacked by irate Togolese fans after they knocked Togo out of the African Cup of Nations qualifier. Frederic Kanoute announced his retirement from international football following Mali's elimination from the 2010 Africa Cup of Nations.

Style of play
In 2001, Kanouté was described by The Irish Times in 2001 as "highly skilful, quick-footed, quick-witted and with an eye for the spectacular." Upon signing for Sevilla in 2005, the club's sporting director, Monchi, described Kanouté with the following words: "He's tall, good in the air, skilful and strong and can play up front or just behind the lead striker." Throughout his career he was also known for his eye for goal. In 2020, Chris Howie of beIN Sports described Kanouté as a "tall, languid, graceful [...] striker," also labelling him a "late bloomer."

Personal life
He has been practicing Islam since he was around the age of 22. He refused to wear a Sevilla shirt bearing the name of club sponsor 888.com, due to the fact the website is used for gambling, which is against the principles of Islam; this meant that the club had to give him a brand-free jersey every match. The company, however, agreed to excuse him from their publicity campaigns in return for Kanouté wearing the sponsored kit, which was part of the players' contractual duties. In 2007, Kanouté paid more than US$700,000 out of his pocket to buy a mosque in Seville. The contract on the premises had expired and the mosque was due to be sold. The Islamic community of Spain confirmed it had requested Kanouté's aid after the mosque was put up for sale. Kanouté helped raise over $1m in a crowdfunding campaign to build the mosque.

Kanouté insists his faith has never presented itself as a problem in his relationship with the coaching staff, teammates or fans. He has stated that "Islam has helped me to be this way, so this is normal. It's a path you take to keep you calm, to help you think about the place you live in, to love your neighbour. It's strange when I hear about all these problems of terrorism because it's the opposite of what I understood for Islam."

He observes fasting during the Islamic month of Ramadan. He has stated that "I can keep fasting in Ramadan even when I am playing...it is sometimes harder to keep the fast because here in the south of Spain it is very hot, but I can do it, thank God."

After scoring a goal in a January 2009 Copa Del Rey match against Deportivo La Coruña, Kanouté lifted his jersey and displayed a black shirt underneath emblazoned with the word "Palestine". The action was interpreted by BBC sources as a protest against the Israeli Army operation in the Gaza Strip ongoing at that time. Kanouté was cautioned with a yellow card for displaying a political message, and subsequently fined around $4,000 by the league.

The Kanouté Foundation
Kanouté has also showed interest in a variety of humanitarian causes. In 2006, he launched an appeal to establish a "Children's Village" in Mali.
This is now the well established Sakina Children's Village. Kanouté talks about his Foundation and the Village in the book, How to do good: Essays in Building a Better World, published in December 2016. He also took part in a speaker tour inspired by the book in 2017, speaking in Oslo, Stockholm, Paris and London alongside other humanitarians and philanthropists.

Career statistics

Club

International

Scores and results list Mali's goal tally first.

Honours
Lyon
 UEFA Intertoto Cup: 1997

Sevilla
 Copa del Rey: 2006–07, 2009–10
 Supercopa de España: 2007
 UEFA Cup: 2005–06, 2006–07
 UEFA Super Cup: 2006

Individual
 African Cup of Nations Team of the Tournament: 2004
 African Footballer of the Year: 2007
ESM Team of the Season: 2006–07

See also

References

External links

Portrait of Frédéric Oumar Kanouté: Not Your Average Footballer Qantara.de, 20 May 2009

1977 births
Living people
Malian Muslims
People from Sainte-Foy-lès-Lyon
French Muslims
French people of Malian descent
Malian people of French descent
Converts to Islam
Malian footballers
French footballers
Association football forwards
Ligue 1 players
Olympique Lyonnais players
Premier League players
Tottenham Hotspur F.C. players
West Ham United F.C. players
La Liga players
Sevilla FC players
UEFA Cup winning players
Chinese Super League players
Beijing Guoan F.C. players
African Footballer of the Year winners
France under-21 international footballers
Mali international footballers
2004 African Cup of Nations players
2008 Africa Cup of Nations players
2010 Africa Cup of Nations players
French expatriate footballers
Malian expatriate footballers
Expatriate footballers in China
Expatriate footballers in England
Expatriate footballers in Spain
French expatriate sportspeople in China
French expatriate sportspeople in England
French expatriate sportspeople in Spain
Malian expatriate sportspeople in China
Malian expatriate sportspeople in England
Malian expatriate sportspeople in Spain
French humanitarians
French philanthropists
Sportspeople from Lyon Metropolis
Footballers from Auvergne-Rhône-Alpes